Rodeites dakshinii is a fossil belonging to the fern family Marsileaceae. The fossil consists of a preserved sporocarp containing spores, and was recovered from a Cenozoic chert of India.

References

Salviniales
Cenozoic plants